Princeton Junction station (signed as Princeton Junction at West Windsor) is a railroad station in Princeton Junction, New Jersey, located in West Windsor Township. It serves NJ Transit (NJT) and Amtrak on the Northeast Corridor (NEC), and NJ Transit on the Princeton Branch.

History

Princeton Junction's origins can be traced back to the United New Jersey Railroad and Canal Company, the predecessor of the Pennsylvania Railroad in the 19th century. The original station was built in 1864, in preparation for Princeton Branch service to begin in 1865.

Albert Einstein, who lived at 112 Mercer Street in Princeton, used to enjoy sitting at the station and watching the trains go by. More than once, he employed trains to explain the practical effects of his General Theory of Relativity.

Very few sections of the Northeast Corridor were capable of handling that speed, and most had to be upgraded before Penn Central's Metroliner service was introduced in 1969. A plaque at the station commemorates the event.

The present station house was built in 1987. Most of Amtrak's Princeton Junction service prior to 2005 was Clocker service commuter traffic to New York, Newark, or Philadelphia. On October 28, 2005, the Clockers were replaced by NJT trains that run only as far south as Trenton.

Transit village
Princeton Junction has been designated the core of the West Windsor transit village, a smart growth initiative to promote transit-oriented development which can include government incentives to encourage compact, higher density, mixed-use development within walking distance of the station. Development adjacent to the station permits higher densities and will include retail end entertainment elements.

Service

As of 2017, Princeton Junction was the 6th-busiest station in the NJ Transit rail system, with an average of 6,817 weekday boardings. In addition to the Northeast Corridor Line, NJT operates a  spur line, the Princeton Branch, to Princeton station located at the Princeton University campus in Princeton. The shuttle is colloquially known as the "Dinky", and has also been known as the "PJ&B" (for "Princeton Junction and Back"). Two train cars, or sometimes just one, are used. A single switch connects the branch to the Northeast Corridor tracks north of the station.

Service on the Princeton Branch was suspended from October 14, 2018 through May 11, 2019, replaced by shuttle buses, as part of NJT's systemwide service reductions during the installation and testing of positive train control.

Amtrak provides two early-morning trains to Washington, D.C., and two evening returns, as well as one morning train to Harrisburg, Pennsylvania and one evening return, all of which call at Philadelphia. Many more Amtrak trains stop at the nearby Trenton Transit Center. Until 2007, all Amtrak Pennsylvanian trains stopped at Princeton Junction. The southbound Amtrak Palmetto began stopping in Princeton Junction in October 2015.

The Central Jersey Route 1 Corridor BRT is a proposed bus rapid transit system which would use Princeton Junction as its hub.

Station layout

The station has two high-level side platforms. Most of Amtrak's Northeast Corridor lines bypass the station via the inner tracks, except for select Keystone and Northeast Regional trains and the weekday southbound Palmetto.

References

External links 

West Windsor Parking Authority
Princeton Junction Amtrak & New Jersey Transit Station (USA RailGuide – TrainWeb)
Station from Google Maps Street View

NJ Transit Rail Operations stations
Stations on the Northeast Corridor
Amtrak stations in New Jersey
Railway stations in Mercer County, New Jersey
Rail junctions in the United States
Railway stations in the United States opened in 1864
West Windsor, New Jersey
Stations on the Princeton Branch
Former Pennsylvania Railroad stations